Hedvig Hedvig Siriane Emilia Ulfsparre (1877–1963) was a Swedish textile collector in Hofors, Gävleborg County, who brought together thousands of artefacts consisting of lace, embroidery, tapestries, and rugs, creating Sweden's largest collection. Many of the works were created by the country's top textile artists including Märta Måås-Fjetterström, Margareta Grandin, Thyra Grafström, Maja Sjöström, Annie Frykholm, Ellen Ståhlbrand, and Hilda Starck Liljenberg. Her companion, the wealthy Per Eriksson who was particularly interested in textiles, gave her free rein to buy the best she could find and so, she did.

References

Further reading 
 

1877 births
1963 deaths
Swedish collectors
People from Helsingborg
Textile industry of Sweden